Leysland High School was a coeducational middle school with academy status, located in Countesthorpe, Leicestershire, England. It was open for students aged 11–14 (students in KS3). It received the rating of 'Outstanding' from Ofsted in April, 2013. It merged with Countesthorpe Community College to form Countesthorpe Leysland Community College in July 2016.

Notable alumni
Harvey Barnes, professional footballer
Original Kasabian band members
Miss Namibia 1997

References

Educational institutions established in 1974
Defunct schools in Leicestershire
1974 establishments in England
Educational institutions disestablished in 2016
2016 disestablishments in England